Argela is a multinational corporation based in Turkey that develops communication technologies mainly for the telecom, public safety, and defense sectors. Founded in 2004, it was acquired by Türk Telekom in 2007, and headquartered in Istanbul. Argela has branches in Sunnyvale and Ankara.

Argela's products include Femtocell, fixed-mobile convergence, IMS/IN Applications, service delivery framework, three screen TV services and performance monitoring tools

Products

iTV 

Argela's iTV is an Internet television service distributed via the Internet. It allows the users to choose the program or the TV show they want to watch from an archive (VoD, TSTV)or live from a channel directory. iTV is Future-safe as internet bandwidth tends to increase in the near future. Tivibu is one of the field proven application which has attracted 110,000 users in first month  using Argela's iTV solution. iTV service won IP&TV industry award for Best IP TV, Hybrid or Connected TV Service Growth Achievement in 2011 by reaching one million subscribers in first year.

Argela ADz-on advertising platform 
Argela ADz-on consists of: ADz-on-Voice, ADz-on-Messaging, ADz-on-TV, ADz-on-Internet and ADz-on-VAS, Adz-on Ringback Tone Advertising.

Fixed-mobile convergence 

Argela's fixed-mobile convergence solution offers an extensive set of SIP clients: Web, PC, iPhone/iPod, Windows Mobile, Symbian, Android and Blackberry.
Tuitalk is a free Voip client made by Argela. It allows users to call landlines and mobile phones via Wi-Fi. The application was released in 2008 for Windows and Mac OS X.
WIROFON service won the CommsMEA “New Telecom Service of the Year” award  was also another application launched by Türk Telekom, later the software was also embedded in LG mobile devices. The campaign became a success with 20,000 device sales in only two weeks.

SCP & IN Applications 

Argela’a Service Control Platform (SCP) is the platform where multiple IN services can be deployed, including ICS(Intra Call Service), Ring Back Tone (RBT), Mobile Virtual Private Network (MVPN), Anonymous Call Rejection (ACR), Smart Call Termination (SCT), Virtual Mobile Attendant (VMA).

IMS Applications 

Argela's IMS Application portfolio includes Multimedia Ring Back Tone (M-RBT), Sponsored Call (SPC), Collect Call Service (CCS), 3rdParty Call Control (3PCC), Virtual Subscription (VS) and Centralized Service Management Platform.

Service Delivery Framework 

Argela's Service Delivery Framework(SDF)  based on Argela's Multiplay Service Delivery Platform(MSDP) promises rapid uptake of new services leading to ARPU and total revenue increase with automated service and partner management capabilities. Automated business processes reduce OPEX and re-use of infrastructure reduce CAPEX.

Performance monitoring tools 

Argela's monitoring tool dedicated to Prepaid subscribers; Prepaid Watcher has mechanisms to watch over and measure operators pre-paid systems.

References 

Telecommunications companies of Turkey